Hitesh Kumari (born 18 March 1942) is a Backward Leader of Uttar Pradesh. She belongs to the Lodhi caste. In 1985, representing the Indian National Congress, she was elected as a Member of the Uttar Pradesh Legislative Assembly for the Debai constituency in Bulandshahr district. In 1988, Uttar Pradesh Chief Minister N. D. Tiwari made her a minister with a portfolio of water resources. She was the second woman MLA from the Bulandshahr district, and the first lady minister in the district. She was also appointed a Member of the Indian Council of Agricultural Research (Central Government, Ministry of Agriculture). Later on she joined the Samajwadi Party in 2007, and in year 2015 she was appointed a National General Secretary of Mahila Wing of Samajwadi Party. In 2021 she was appointed a National Secretary in main body of Samajwadi Party by National President Akhilesh Yadav.

References

Living people
Members of the Uttar Pradesh Legislative Assembly
Samajwadi Party politicians
Indian National Congress politicians from Uttar Pradesh
Women in Uttar Pradesh politics
State cabinet ministers of Uttar Pradesh
20th-century Indian women politicians
20th-century Indian politicians
21st-century Indian women politicians
21st-century Indian politicians
Women state cabinet ministers of India
1942 births